William Harris (c. 1652 – 17 October 1709), of Hayne, Devon, was an English landowner and politician  who sat in the English and British House of Commons between 1690 and 1709.

Early life 
Harris was the eldest son of Christopher Harris of Hayne, Devon and Kenegie in Gulval, Cornwall and his wife Elizabeth Trott, daughter of Martin Trott of Langridge, Devon. While nothing is known about his educational background, on 12 May 1682 he and three other men (including John Tredenham) were granted a patent for a new device to drain water out of mines, in particular the Cornish tin mines. On 4 October 1685, he married Jane St  Aubyn  daughter of John St Aubyn of  Clowance, Cornwall. In 1687, Harris succeeded to the estate of Hayne on the death of his father who had inherited it the previous year from his cousin, Sir Arthur Harris, 1st Baronet, of Stowford.

Career 
At the 1690 English general election, Harris was returned as Member of Parliament for St Ives and was listed as a Whig  by Lord Carmarthen, and seen as a probable supporter of the Carmarthen Ministry if it were to come under attack. In 1691 Harris took his first leave of absence on grounds of ill-health, a pattern that continued throughout his parliamentary career. He did not stand for re-election at the  1695 English general election. He remained active in local politics, becoming a councilman in the new Plymouth corporation in 1696. At the 1698 English general election he was returned unopposed as MP for Okehampton, where his family had an interest, and was classed as a Country Whig. He was returned unopposed for Okehampton at the two general elections of 1701 and by December 1701 was regarded as having become more or less a Tory. He did not stand at the 1702 English general election, but served as High Sheriff of Devon for the year 1703 to 1704 and became Deputy Lieutenant for Devon in March 1705. He was defeated in a contest at Okehampton at the 1705 English general election. At the 1708 British general election he was returned unopposed again. The Whigs were unable to work out his political inclinations, but judged him a better choice than the Tory incumbent Thomas Northmore.

Death and legacy
Harris died on 17 October 1709 aged 57. He and his wife had three sons - Christopher, John and William, and one daughter, Jane. He was succeeded in Parliament by his son  Christopher, who was also his executor.

References 

1650s births
1709 deaths
Members of the Parliament of England for St Ives
Members of the Parliament of England for Okehampton
British MPs 1708–1710
High Sheriffs of Devon
English MPs 1690–1695
English MPs 1698–1700
English MPs 1701
English MPs 1701–1702
Members of the Parliament of Great Britain for Okehampton